Clematis rehderiana is a species of Clematis native to Nepal and China (Qinghai and Tibet). It has gained the Royal Horticultural Society's Award of Garden Merit.

References

rehderiana
Plants described in 1914
Taxa named by William Grant Craib